Bienvenue Kanakimana (born 28 December 1999) is a Burundian footballer who currently plays as a winger for MFK Vyškov.

Club career
Kanakimana spent the 2018 season with Aigle Noir of the Burundi Premier League, finishing as the league's top scorer with 23 goals across all competitions and leading his team to the league title.  He was subsequently transferred to MFK Vyškov on 1 January 2019 and was later loaned to Atlanta United 2 on April 12 for the remainder of the season.

On 17 February 2021, Kanakimana permanently joined USL Championship side Colorado Springs Switchbacks. On 7 May 2021, Kanakimana and Colorado Springs mutually agreed to terminate his contract at the club due to visa issues.

International career
In September 2019, Kanakimana was called into the Burundi national team for its 2022 World Cup qualifiers against Tanzania. He made his senior international debut on September 4, 2019.

References

External links

1999 births
Living people
Burundian footballers
Burundian expatriate footballers
Burundi international footballers
Burundi under-20 international footballers
Burundi youth international footballers
Association football wingers
MFK Vyškov players
Atlanta United 2 players
Xinjiang Tianshan Leopard F.C. players
Colorado Springs Switchbacks FC players
Austrian Regionalliga players
China League One players
USL Championship players
Sportspeople from Bujumbura
Burundian expatriate sportspeople in the Czech Republic
Burundian expatriate sportspeople in the United States
Burundian expatriate sportspeople in Austria
Burundian expatriate sportspeople in China
Expatriate footballers in the Czech Republic
Expatriate soccer players in the United States
Expatriate footballers in Austria
Expatriate footballers in China